Little Chef was a chain of restaurants in the United Kingdom, founded in 1958 by entrepreneur Sam Alper, who was inspired by American diners. The chain was famous for the "Olympic Breakfast" – its version of a full English – as well as its "Early Starter" and "Jubilee Pancakes". The restaurants were mostly located on the roadside near A roads, often paired with a Travelodge motel, a Burger King and a petrol station. The chain was also located along motorways in Moto Services, for a time.

The chain expanded rapidly throughout the 1970s, and its parent company would acquire the Happy Eater chain in the 1980s, its only major roadside competitor. When its owners converted all Happy Eater restaurants to Little Chef in the late 1990s, this allowed it to peak in scale with 439 restaurants. Little Chef began to face decline in the early 2000s, this mainly due to the chain expanding too fast, meaning it could not properly invest in all of its locations. Compared to its peak in the late 1990s, by 2005 the chain had lost almost half of its locations.

In 2007, the chain entered administration, marking 41 out of 239 restaurants to close. This was followed by another closure programme in 2012 to reduce the chain to 94 restaurants. In early 2017, licence owners Kout Food Group sold the remaining 70 locations to Euro Garages, who would convert the restaurants into their partner franchises such as Starbucks, Subway and Greggs. After Euro Garages licence expired, the remaining 36 restaurants were renamed EG Diner in January 2018, and were either converted or closed by the end of October 2018. The defunct Little Chef brand still remains owned by Kout Food Group; however, the trademark is now registered in Kuwait as the group are no longer operating in the United Kingdom.

History

Beginnings (1958–1970)

Caravan manufacturer Sam Alper built and designed the first Little Chef, modelled on diners he had seen in the United States, particularly one in Leedey, Oklahoma which was called Little Chef. Opened in 1958 on Oxford Road, Reading, it had just 11 seats. The earliest Little Chefs were basic, prefabricated constructions, with room for up to 20 customers, a staff of three to four and provision for car parking. There was also a short-lived experiment in 1964 with a branch in London's Regent's Park.

From 1965, the outlets began to be built in brick, with room for about 40 customers, by which time there were 12 outlets. Standard décor and uniforms were brought in, together with staff training. Later on, they were built with room for some 60 customers, car parking space was improved, and sign boards and other identifying marks emphasised. In 1968, Gardner Merchant became a subsidiary of Trust Houses, by which time there were 25 Little Chef restaurants.

Trust House Forte (1970–1995) 
In 1970 Trust Houses merged with Charles Forte's hotel and catering empire to become Trust House Forte; Europe's largest hotel, catering and leisure group. By that time, Trust House Forte had 44 Little Chef restaurants. The takeover by Forte gave Little Chef the capital and resources to expand rapidly. Frustrated by planning laws, Forte sent teams out to well-located transport cafes and offered the owners large cash incentives to sell and move out within the week so that Forte could turn their restaurants into Little Chefs. Thus, by 1972 the chain had expanded to 100 outlets. In the 1970s there were two in France, both of which closed by 1976. Sites were a mixture of self-service and waitress service, though predominantly the former. By 1976 there were 174 outlets, and the first "Little Chef Lodge" motel was opened. In 1977, "Jubilee Pancakes" were added to the menu.
Little Chef outlets were opened at larger Trust House Forte service areas on motorways and trunk roads. In 1987 these service areas became known as Welcome Break after the acquisition of the smaller Welcome Break group of motorway service areas and the Happy Eater roadside restaurants, Little Chef's main rival at the time, in 1986 as part of the break-up of Imperial Group. In 1990 the Little Chef Lodges were rebranded as Travelodge. In 1992–3, two sites were opened in the Republic of Ireland.

In 1995 Forte announced the end of the Happy Eater brand, with all existing sites converted into Little Chef by 1997.

Little Chef had a spin-off brand called "Little Chef Express" which Forte developed in 1995 as a rival to fast food outlets. The first Express outlet was at the Markham Moor service station (A1 North), though only as an addition to the existing Little Chef menu there. However, only five restaurants were ever built on the roadside, and the idea was re-developed when Little Chef was taken over by Compass, with the Express take outs being set up in food courts, including one in the Eurostar terminal.

Granada (1995–2000) 
In 1996 the catering and broadcasting conglomerate Granada successfully mounted a hostile takeover for the Forte group. The Welcome Break chain was sold by Granada, the Little Chefs at those motorway service areas becoming a similar table service restaurant, Red Hen. High prices earned the chain the nickname "Little Thief".
In 1998, Granada bought AJ's Family Restaurants, another Little Chef rival, from the "Celebrated Group" and converted all of its fifteen sites to Little Chefs. AJ's had originally been set up in 1986 by two Happy Eater directors, following Happy Eater's sale to Forte.

Compass (2000–2002) 

In 2000, Granada merged with the Compass Group to form Granada Compass, but the two demerged in 2001 leaving Little Chef as part of Compass. At about this time some Little Chefs began serving Harry Ramsden's meals, a cross-branding exercise by Compass who also owned Harry Ramsden's, though this ended in June 2004.

Permira (2002–2005) 
The private equity business Permira bought Travelodge and Little Chef from Compass Group in December 2002 for £712 million, forming a special purpose vehicle called TLLC Group Holdings. Those Little Chefs at Moto motorway service areas – formerly the Granada motorway service areas, and owned by Compass until 2006 – were owned by Moto and operated as franchised outlets.

In August 2004, Little Chef announced it planned to change its logo, to a slimmer version of 'Fat Charlie', the chain's current mascot. Little Chef's chief executive Tim Scoble said that this was " the start of a re-image programme for Little Chef" and that the chain "has become a little bit dated", but now wishes to "take it forward into the 21st century". He also stated that: "We get accusations that he's overweight and a lot of people have also written in to say it was a small child carrying hot food, which they said was dangerous". However, the idea was dropped after 15,000 customers complained.

In December 2004, a Little Chef features in series finale of Max and Paddy's Road to Nowhere, where the hungry characters threaten the waitress with a gun in order to be served after closing time.

In 2005 it was announced by Permira that 130 underperforming restaurants were to be closed, reducing the chain to 234 restaurants. Prior to that however, Compass had been gradually reducing the number of restaurants, from well over 400 at one time. During 2005 Travelodge Hotels Ltd (the new name for TLLC) made various announcements about the sale of some or all of the restaurants, until in October the chain was sold to The People's Restaurant Group Ltd, who planned to modernise the restaurants and introduce self-service.

In 2005, the five Little Chef restaurants in Ireland were sold off to new operators, and the Little Chefs were rebranded. The two Dublin ones became "Metzo" restaurants and the three others became Eddie Rockets Diners.

The People's Restaurant Group (2005–2007) 
In 2005 the company was sold to catering entrepreneurs Lawrence Wosskow and Simon Heath for £58 million. TLLC kept hold of Travelodge, and The People's Restaurant Group Ltd was founded by the new owners of Little Chef, however they continued trading under the same name. In March 2006, the People's Restaurant Group sold 65 of its sites under a leaseback deal for £59 million to Israeli property group Arazim.

Changes introduced during 2006 included the opening of coffee shops under the name Coffee Tempo! within several larger branches. These 'grab and go' units were developed by Nick Smith, who joined Little Chef as development director after leading the design and implementation of the Wild Bean Café format at BP petrol stations. Little Chef also introduced a takeaway menu. Both initiatives were aimed to increase the appeal of the brand to customers unwilling to spend a long period waiting for table service.

The People's Restaurant group slashed menu prices in an attempt to attract customers. The only outcome of this was less money going through the tills.

In December 2006, it was reported that Little Chef was undergoing serious financial problems; the business was said to be losing around £3m a year, struggling to keep up with rent payments and had lost nearly half of its branches in five years. Furthermore, Lawrence Wosskow suffered a heart attack and subsequent ill health earlier in the year, and was unable to help turn the company around. On 21 December, Little Chef announced it was in urgent rescue talks with a group of American investors, in the attempt to secure rescue funding. It had been suggested at the time that PricewaterhouseCoopers was on standby to act as administrators for the company; however a source close to the company was quoted as saying "We are still very hopeful that this situation can be resolved." At the time, the People's Restaurant Group was being advised by KPMG's corporate recovery arm.

In December 2006, Little Chef was taken into administration, and the company was then rescued on 3 January 2007 by RCapital, a UK private equity group, which paid less than £10 million. 38 of the 235 branches were not included in the sale and were closed immediately; the remaining restaurants continued to operate normally.

RCapital (2007–2013) 
By December 2007 a number of sites not leased from Travelodge or Arazim (Little Chef's two main landlords) closed, as Little Chef had not been able to reach agreements with the individual landlords. As all the franchised outlets at Moto sites closed down between 2008 and 2010, many of which were replaced by Costa Coffee, the chain was further reduced.

In 2009, celebrity chef Heston Blumenthal appeared in a Channel 4 documentary programme to revamp the Little Chef chain; the programme was broadcast from 19 to 21 January, and involved Blumenthal introducing a new menu and organising a refit at the Little Chef in the village of Popham, near Basingstoke. The trial was successful, with a promise from the owner that none of the dishes would change without Blumenthal's consent. Heston Blumenthal returned to Popham in February 2009 to review progress, and the owner promised that if there was a profit within three months the redesigned format would be spread to all branches. Furthermore, two more former Little Chef branches would reopen, in Ings and Malton. It was later announced that a further two Little Chefs, at York and Kettering, would be refurbished in the style of the trial in Popham.

In 2011, a further ten new concept restaurants opened at Doncaster, Markham Moor North, Shrewsbury, Black Cat, Fontwell, Weston on the Green North, Wisley South, Ilminster, Podimore and Amesbury with a view to investing £20 million in updating the brand across the estate. New menus had been introduced and restaurants had been refurbished based on the style which Blumenthal designed in 2009. A full rebranding exercise was undertaken by Venture Three, which was hailed as a great success by the graphic design community. As part of its modernisation the company used its new branding to create a presence in the digital arena on Facebook and Twitter.

A 'Good to Go' deli offering was introduced in the new concept restaurants, making bespoke sandwiches as well as takeaway meals appealing to customers on the move. 'Good to Go' sat alongside the traditional sit-down Little Chef format.

In May 2011 the company reported a 47% increase in food sales.

On 11 January 2012, Little Chef announced that it planned to close 67 of its failing restaurants, with the loss of up to 600 jobs. On 7 February 2012, RCapital announced that it was putting the Little Chef chain through "a pre-pack administration to offload a number of toxic leases". Graham Sims, the chairman of Little Chef, said that suppliers and other unsecured creditors would suffer from the decision to put the chain through this administration process, which had been taken reluctantly. He expected job losses to be at the lower end of the previously announced range of 500 to 600. The business was to refocus on a core of 95 profitable sites.

By January 2012, 11 Little Chefs had been converted to the Blumenthal format.

In April 2012, the chairman Graham Sims said, "Everyone remembers Little Chef from the 1970s, with curtains at the windows and wooden tables. It worked well for 20 or 30 years but frankly it hasn't kept pace with the evolution of the retail market. It lost its way. We've gone through 3 or 4 owners in 10 years and none of them have really taken the tough decisions to sort out the assets, the cost base and bring up the offer for the 21st century." In his view, some of the owners had treated it as "a cash cow, looking for the traditional quick in and out".

In May 2012, Little Chef closed its headquarters in Sheffield, outsourcing its operational day-to-day support to Lt Pubs Limited in Norfolk, as well as its marketing/PR to Parker Hobart. The Barnsdale Bar South branch closed in 2012, however the former restaurant would then house the Little Chef's IT department for a short time. In September of that year, the company announced plans to franchise.

In April 2013, R Capital announced that it was to seek a buyer for the Little Chef business which comprised 78 outlets, from Scotland to Cornwall, all of which were said to be profitable. The move indicated that R Capital had succeeded through tough restructuring in turning round the company's fortunes. The sale was expected to have a price tag of 'tens of millions of pounds'.

In June 2013, Little Chef announced that it dropped Heston Blumenthal's creations from all its menus. Little Chef spokesman Richard Hillgrove was quoted as saying that 'Heston originally approached us to do his Channel 4 show about how he was going to save Little Chef. It seemed like a good idea at the time. But he took everything away from its core.'

Kout Food Group (2013–2017) 
In August 2013, RCapital sold Little Chef to Kuwaiti firm Kout Food Group, who continued revamping restaurants, as well as adding Subway concessions to some, and returning Burger King back into some of the sites that had them before, such as Penrith and Ely. In 2014, Little Chef lost more restaurants including Dreghorn (January 2014), Royston (March 2014) and Whiddon Down (October 2014). Whiddon Down was one of the busiest Little Chefs in the southwest; it was closed and the company operated a restaurant out of a quieter location, Sourton Cross. By 2014, around 14 restaurants had received full 'Wonderfully British' refurbishments.

The group continued to invest in its locations, the last of which being Warminster in May 2016 which was given a large refurbishment. The chain also ran a Summer of Big Wins prize competition. From November 2016, the Little Chef website and social media channels stopped being updated.

Euro Garages (2017–2018) 
In February 2017, Euro Garages purchased the Little Chef locations from Kout Food Group, though with Kout retaining full rights to Little Chef's intellectual property and franchise control. Euro Garages began a programme to close down all Little Chefs, replacing them with their other brands such as Starbucks and Greggs. Not long after this announcement, the number of Little Chefs dropped down to 66 outlets, due to the closure of under-performing sites such as Winterbourne Abbas, Axminster and Dolgellau. In July 2017, Euro Garages brought about the closure of two of the chain's prime locations: the Blumenthal-remodelled Popham and Barton Stacey.

The closure process of Little Chef was scheduled to be complete before the end of 2017, but was postponed until early 2018 due to timing problems. Kout Food Group revoked Euro Garage's Little Chef franchise at the end of January 2018, causing Euro Garages to temporarily rename all Little Chef locations to EG Diner until they could be converted into partner brands. The final EG Diners that were not rebranded, closed in October 2018.

Legacy 
The defunct brand is currently owned by Kout Food Group, who also own Happy Eater and Coffee Tempo! trademarks. Accounts previously filed show that there was interest in franchising the Little Chef brand in the future, though nothing has come of this thus far. In 2019, Edwin Coe, solicitors for Kout Food Group at the time, threatened to sue chef Matei Baran if he did not cease his £600 trademark application of 'Big Chef, Little Chef' for an upcoming book, it was changed to 'Big Chef, Mini Chef' by Baran. Later in 2019, a company called 'Little Chef Ltd' was ordered to have its name changed.

Until October 2022, the Little Chef website remained operational featuring the 2015 menu and list of locations, all of which had closed.

In November 2022, Loungers announced they were launching Brightside Roadside Dining to fill the gap in the market created by the demise of Little Chef and Happy Eater. In February 2023, the company's first roadside diner opened in a former Little Chef unit on the A38 to Exeter in Kennford, Devon.

In popular culture

Still Crazy makes repeated reference to a band member overdosing in a Little Chef.

The Frazier Chorus song Little Chef, on their album Sue, also mentions Happy Eater.

See also
Happy Eater

References

External links

British brands
Catering and food service companies of the United Kingdom
Fast-food chains of the United Kingdom
Defunct fast-food chains
Companies based in Norwich
British companies established in 1958
Restaurants established in 1958
Restaurants disestablished in 2018
Companies that have entered administration in the United Kingdom
1958 establishments in the United Kingdom
2018 disestablishments in the United Kingdom
Defunct restaurants in the United Kingdom